Ruth Nestvold (born 1958) is an American Science fiction and Fantasy writer.

Biography
Born in the state of Washington and raised in Oregon, she now lives in Stuttgart, Germany, where she works in technical translation and localization.

Her first professional publication was "Latency Time," published in Asimov's Science Fiction in 2001. Since then, her short fiction has appeared in numerous publications, including Realms of Fantasy, Sci Fiction, Strange Horizons, Futurismic, and several year's best anthologies. In 2004, her novella "Looking Through Lace" was short-listed for the Tiptree Award and nominated for the Sturgeon Award. In 2007, the Italian translation Il linguaggio segreto won the "Premio Italia" Award for best work of science fiction or fantasy translated into Italian in 2006. Her short story "Mars: A Traveler’s Guide" was a finalist for the 2008 Nebula Award for Best Short Story. She is also a regular contributor to The Internet Review of Science Fiction.

Nestvold is a graduate of Clarion West Writers Workshop 1998.

External links
Ruth Nestvold's official web page
Announcement of the winners of the Premio Italia awards (in Italian)

1958 births
Living people
American women novelists
American science fiction writers
Women science fiction and fantasy writers
21st-century American women